Onslow Airport  is located  south of the coastal town of Onslow in Western Australia's Pilbara region. 

The airport is used for FIFO, private charter, general aviation, Royal Flying Doctor Services and Virgin Australia Regional Airlines who operated 8 services per week. The airport is owned and operated by the Shire of Ashburton.

Airlines and destinations

See also
 List of airports in Western Australia
 Aviation transport in Australia
 Operation Potshot

References

External links
 Airservices Aerodromes & Procedure Charts

Pilbara airports
Shire of Ashburton